A Simple Favor (known in the UK and Ireland as A Simple Favour) is a 2018 American black comedy crime thriller film directed by Paul Feig from a screenplay by Jessica Sharzer, based on the 2017 novel of the same name by Darcey Bell. It stars Anna Kendrick, Blake Lively, Henry Golding, Andrew Rannells, Linda Cardellini, Rupert Friend, and Jean Smart and follows a small-town vlogger who tries to solve the disappearance of her elegant and mysterious friend.

It was released in the United States on September 14, 2018, by Lionsgate. Critics praised the plot twists, and the performances of Kendrick, Lively and Golding. It grossed $97 million worldwide on a $20 million budget. A sequel is in development, with Kendrick and Lively set to reprise their roles, and Feig returning to direct.

Plot 

Widowed single mother Stephanie Smothers runs a vlog featuring crafts and recipes for parents.  She becomes friends with Emily Nelson, the mother of her son's schoolmate and a PR director for a fashion company, and they exchange confessions over martinis. Stephanie shares that as a teenager, she had sex with her half-brother Chris. Emily is frustrated by the lack of success of her husband, English professor Sean Townsend, and their (well-hidden) poor financial situation.

Stephanie babysits Emily's son while Sean is in London. After two days of Emily not returning calls, she learns from Emily's boss, Dennis Nylon, that she is in Miami. Stephanie calls Sean, who contacts the police. Trying to get to the bottom of Emily's disappearance, she makes missing person flyers using a photo of Emily that she found hidden on her desk.

Detective Summerville reports that Emily lied about flying to Miami, and that her drowned body had been discovered in the lake at a summer camp in Michigan. Stephanie and Sean share their grief and begin a sexual relationship. Summerville reveals to Stephanie that Emily had severe liver damage, a large amount of heroin in her system, and that Sean had recently taken out a $4 million life insurance on her.

Stephanie receives an insulting message apparently from Emily about her tryst with her half-brother Chris. She has a flashback of her late husband suspecting her infidelity, possibly leading him to cause the car crash that killed both him and Chris. 

Investigating Emily's past, Stephanie meets Diana Hyland, who seems to have been a lover of Emily and who had painted a portrait of her. Diana says that the painting is actually of her muse Claudia, whom she describes as a con artist who disappeared. Her information leads Stephanie to a yearbook that shows Emily to be a girl named Hope McLanden, and who had an identical twin named Faith. Stephanie visits Margaret, the mother of the twins, who explains that at 16, the twins had set fire to the family house, killing their father, and disappeared.

Meanwhile, while Stephanie is away on these investigative trips, Emily surprises Sean by reappearing, and tells him that she plans to collect the insurance money and leave the country. Stephanie later contrives to meet with Emily, who explains that she and her sister indeed started the fire to kill their abusive father. 

The sisters fled separately with a plan to reunite later, but Faith didn't turn up as agreed. Emily then built a career and family but then Faith reappeared 14 years later. Now an alcoholic and heroin addict, Faith threatened to turn them both in to the authorities by confessing the patricide unless paid a million dollars by Emily. After assenting to the demand, Emily drowned Faith in the lake (as revealed to the movie audience), but Emily tells Stephanie that Faith committed suicide and that Sean planned the insurance scam.

Emily and Stephanie are both angered by Sean's relationship with the other and decide to frame Sean. He is arrested and released on bail. Stephanie has a change of heart and stages an argument with Sean in front of Emily in order to incriminate her while police-planted microphones are recording the meeting. Stephanie fakes shooting Sean. 

Emily, having predicted their ruse and disabled the microphones, confesses her crimes while holding the pair at gunpoint, saying that she will stage their murder-suicide. Shooting Sean in the shoulder, she turns the gun on Stephanie, who reveals that a hidden camera is livestreaming the entire event on her vlog. Emily attempts to escape, only to be hit by a car driven by Stephanie's friend Darren. She is arrested immediately after.

Closing text says that Emily was sentenced to 20 years in prison, Sean's second novel was a bestseller and he became a successful professor at Berkeley, and Stephanie is said to be dating another man and that her vlog has a million followers and is being developed as a TV show and also that she is a part-time private detective. In a mid-credits scene, Emily is seen winning a basketball game in prison.

Cast 
 Anna Kendrick as Stephanie Smothers
 Blake Lively as Emily Nelson / Hope McLanden and Faith McLanden
 Nicole Peters & Lauren Peters as Hope McLanden and Faith McLanden (16 years old)
 Henry Golding as Sean Townsend
 Andrew Rannells as Darren
 Linda Cardellini as Diana Hyland
 Dustin Milligan as Chris 
 Jean Smart as Margaret McLanden
 Rupert Friend as Dennis Nylon
 Eric Johnson as Davis Smothers
 Bashir Salahuddin as Detective Summerville
 Aparna Nancherla as Sona
 Joshua Satine as Miles Smothers
 Ian Ho as Nicky Nelson
 Kelly McCormack as Stacy
 Sarah Baker as Maryanne Chelkowsky
 Melissa O'Neil as Beth T.A.
 Patti Harrison as Kiko
 Corinne Conley as librarian

Production

Development 
In January 2016, it was announced that 20th Century Fox had bought the film rights to author Darcey Bell's novel A Simple Favor prior to the book's publication. The story was pitched as being similar to Gone Girl and The Girl on the Train. Creative Artists Agency represented the movie rights in the deal with Fox.

Pre-production 
In June 2017, it was announced that A Simple Favor would be extricated from 20th Century Fox and instead be distributed by Lionsgate. It was also announced that it would be directed by Paul Feig, with Anna Kendrick and Blake Lively "in talks" for the lead roles. On July 26, 2017, Kendrick and Lively were confirmed, while Henry Golding joined the cast as the husband of Lively's character. Linda Cardellini was announced as having been cast in an undisclosed role in September 2017, and Andrew Rannells, Jean Smart, and Rupert Friend were later added.

Filming 
A Simple Favor commenced principal photography on August 14, 2017 in Toronto, Ontario, Canada. It was shot in the Univisium 2.00:1 aspect ratio on Panavision Millennium DXL 8K cameras.

Release
The film was released on September 14, 2018.

Marketing
On May 1, 2018, Blake Lively hid all pictures from her Instagram account to promote the film. The first teaser trailer was released on May 2, 2018, followed by the second teaser trailer, which was released on May 24.

Reception

Box office
A Simple Favor grossed $53.5 million in the United States and Canada, and $44.1 million in other territories, for a total worldwide gross of $97.6 million, against a production budget of $20 million.

In the United States and Canada, it was released alongside White Boy Rick, Unbroken: Path to Redemption and The Predator, and was projected to gross $12–15 million from 3,102 theaters in its opening weekend. It made $5.9 million on its first day (including $900,000 from Thursday night previews) and $16.1 million over the weekend, finishing third, behind The Predator and The Nun. It dropped just 35% in its second weekend, to $10.4 million, finishing second, behind newcomer The House with a Clock in Its Walls.

Critical response
The site's critical consensus reads, "Twisty, twisted, and above all simply fun, A Simple Favor casts a stylish mommy noir spell strengthened by potent performances from Anna Kendrick and Blake Lively." On Metacritic, the film has a weighted average score of 67 out of 100, based on 40 critics, indicating "generally favorable reviews". Audiences polled by CinemaScore gave the film an average grade of "B+" on an A+ to F scale, while PostTrak reported filmgoers gave it a 76% positive score.

Amy Nicholson of Variety wrote: "The film feels a lot like the Serge Gainsbourg number that Stephanie dances to in the kitchen: jazzy, a little sleazy, and worth a cult following."

Sequel
In May 2022, a sequel was announced, with Feig returning to direct the film, and Kendrick and Lively set to reprise their roles. Lionsgate will co-produce the film with Amazon Studios.

References

External links 

 
 
 

2018 black comedy films
2010s buddy comedy films
2010s comedy mystery films
2010s comedy thriller films
2010s female buddy films
2010s mystery thriller films
American black comedy films
American buddy comedy films
American comedy mystery films
American comedy thriller films
American female buddy films
American mystery thriller films
Bron Studios films
Films about interracial romance
Films about missing people
Films about twin sisters
Films based on American crime novels
Films based on American thriller novels
Films based on mystery novels
Films directed by Paul Feig
Films produced by Paul Feig
Films scored by Theodore Shapiro
Films set in Connecticut
Films set in Manhattan
Films set in Michigan
Films shot in New York City
Films shot in Toronto
Incest in film
Lionsgate films
Films about social media
Patricide in fiction
Sororicide in fiction
2018 crime thriller films
2010s English-language films
2010s American films